Bahaedeen Ahmad Alshannik (born 18 July 1997) is a Jordanian badminton player. He was the mixed doubles runner-up at the Morocco International tournament in 2014 and 2015, and also men's doubles runner-up in 2015. At the Egypt International tournament he became the runner-up in the men's doubles event. He won his first international title at the 2017 Uganda International tournament in the mixed doubles event partnered with Domou Amro. At the Cameroon, he won double title when he captured the men's singles and doubles event.

Achievements

BWF International Challenge/Series (8 titles, 16 runners-up) 
Men's singles

Men's doubles

Mixed doubles

  BWF International Challenge tournament
  BWF International Series tournament
  BWF Future Series tournament

References

External links 
 

Living people
1997 births
Jordanian male badminton players